Monika González-Hermosillo (born October 27, 1995) is a German-Mexican-American competitive swimmer. She won 3 gold medals at the 2018 Central American and Caribbean Games, and a bronze medal at the 2019 Pan American Games.

Career
Gonzalez swam for Texas A&M under Steve Bultman.

References

External links

1995 births
Living people
Mexican female swimmers
Mexican female freestyle swimmers
Pan American Games medalists in swimming
Pan American Games bronze medalists for Mexico
Swimmers at the 2019 Pan American Games
Competitors at the 2018 Central American and Caribbean Games
Central American and Caribbean Games medalists in swimming
Central American and Caribbean Games gold medalists for Mexico
Central American and Caribbean Games bronze medalists for Mexico
Medalists at the 2019 Pan American Games
20th-century Mexican women
21st-century Mexican women